"Carmen" is a song by Belgian singer Stromae, the sixth single from his second album Racine carrée. 
The animated music video, illustrated by Sylvain Chomet, the director of Belleville Rendez-Vous, was posted on social networks by the Facebook account of the American news website BuzzFeed Music. The video and lyrics of the song violently attack social networks through the depiction of the Twitter bird, set to the tune of "Habanera" from Georges Bizet's opera Carmen.

Themes
The song is an adaptation of the aria L'amour est un oiseau rebelle (Love is a rebellious bird - more commonly known in English as Habanera), from the opera Carmen by French composer Georges Bizet. The song addresses the theme of alienation through social networks.

Music video
The animated video was drawn by Sylvain Chomet. At the beginning of the clip, a young Stromae can be seen on his Twitter account. A little blue bird arrives (representative of the mascot of Twitter) who starts to hum. Stromae takes a selfie with the bird and puts the picture on his account. Gradually, the bird becomes larger and takes up more space in his life and keeps him away from others. The bird eventually takes him and puts him on its back as it travels down a stretch of road. On the back of other identical birds, he sees other celebrities like Orelsan, Justin Bieber, Kanye West and Kim Kardashian, Lady Gaga, Barack Obama, Queen Elizabeth II of the United Kingdom, and many others. Then his bird takes him by the neck and feeds him and the others to a huge blue bird monster, who is seen excreting its prey. A hand comes out of the faeces to take a photo of people falling. At the end of the clip, a little blue bird comes to sing at the window of Stromae's sister's room, who strikes his cell phone, bookending the video.

Charts

References

2013 songs
2015 singles
Compositions by Georges Bizet
Songs written by Orelsan
Songs written by Stromae
Stromae songs